The 2015 6 Hours of Bahrain was an endurance sports car racing event held on the Grand Prix Circuit of the Bahrain International Circuit, Sakhir, Bahrain on 19–21 November 2015, and served as the eighth and last race of the 2015 FIA World Endurance Championship season. Porsche's Marc Lieb, Romain Dumas and Neel Jani won the race driving the No. 18 Porsche 919 Hybrid car.

Qualifying

Qualifying result
Pole position winners in each class are marked in bold.

Race

Race result
Class winners in bold.

See also 
 2015 Bahrain 2nd GP2 Series round
 2015 Bahrain GP3 Series round

References

8 Hours of Bahrain
6 Hours
Bahrain